Dog's balls or dog's bollocks may refer to:

 The testicles of a dog
 Grewia retusifolia, a shrub species in the family Malvaceae
 Dog's bollocks, a slang expression in British English
 Dog's bollocks (typography), an outdated construction in British English
 Dog-balls, in golf, a score of eight on a single hole
 Dog Balls, a character in the 2006 Chinese film Trouble Makers